Balduina atropurpurea, the purpledisk honeycombhead, is a North American species of plants in the sunflower family. It is native to the southeastern United States (Florida, Georgia, Alabama, South Carolina, North Carolina).

Balduina atropurpurea is a perennial herb with branching stems. Each plant has 1-4 flower heads, each with yellow ray florets and purple disc florets. The species grows in pinelands and savannahs.

References

External links
[lants.usda.gov/core/profile?symbol=BAAT USDA Plants Profile for Balduina atropurpurea (purpledisk honeycombhead)]

Helenieae
Endemic flora of the United States
Flora of Alabama
Flora of Florida
Flora of Georgia (U.S. state)
Flora of North Carolina
Flora of South Carolina
Plants described in 1901